Auburn is an unincorporated community in Lincoln County, in the U.S. state of Missouri.

History
Auburn was platted in 1838, and named after Auburn, New York, the native home of a share of the first settlers. A post office called Auburn was established in 1828, and remained in operation until 1905.

References

Unincorporated communities in Lincoln County, Missouri
Unincorporated communities in Missouri